Karen I. Mathiak (born November 6, 1955) is an American chiropractor and politician from Georgia. Mathiak is a Republican member of Georgia House of Representatives for District 73.

Early life 
Mathiak was born in Michigan.

Education 
In 1984, Mathiak graduated from the Doctor of Chiropractic program from Life University in Marietta, Georgia.

Career 
Mathiak started her career as a chiropractic assistant for Dr. Ron Graves. Mathiak became a chiropractor.

In 2003, Mathiak was appointed to become a member of the Georgia Board of Chiropractic Examiners by Governor Sonny Perdue. In 2011, Mathiak was appointed to the Georgia Board of Chiropractic Examiners again by Governor Nathan Deal.

On November 8, 2016, Mathiak won the election and became a Republican member of Georgia House of Representatives for District 73. Mathiak defeated Rahim Talley with 64.53% of the votes. On November 6, 2018, as an incumbent, Mathiak won the election unopposed and continued serving District 73. On November 3, 2020, as an incumbent, Mathiak won the election and continued serving District 73. Mathiak defeated William Harris.

Personal life 
Mathiak's husband is Marty. Mathiak and her family live in Griffin, Georgia.

References

External links 
 Karen Mathiak at ballotpedia.org
 weneedkaren.com
 Karen Mathiak at congressweb.com

21st-century American politicians
21st-century American women politicians
American chiropractors
Life University alumni
Living people
People from Griffin, Georgia
Women state legislators in Georgia (U.S. state)
Republican Party members of the Georgia House of Representatives
1955 births